In the 2015 Copa América, the main disciplinary action taken against players came in the form of red and yellow cards.

Any player picking up a red card was expelled from the pitch and automatically banned for his country's next match, whether via a straight red or second yellow. After a straight red card, FIFA would conduct a hearing and could extend this ban beyond one match. If the ban extended beyond the end of the finals (i.e. if a player was sent off in the match in which his team was eliminated), it had to be served in the team's next competitive international match(es). In most cases, that was the first matches of 2018 FIFA World Cup qualifying.

Disciplinary statistics
Total number of yellow cards: 113
Average yellow cards per match: 4.71
Total number of red cards:  7
Average red cards per match: 0.25
First yellow card: Fidel Martínez (Ecuador against Chile)
First red card: Matías Fernández (Chile against Ecuador)
Fastest yellow card from kick off: 5 minutes (Abel Hernández; Uruguay against Paraguay)
Fastest yellow card after coming on as substitute: 1 minute (Derlis González; Paraguay against Argentina and Franklin Lucena; Venezuela against Colombia)
Latest yellow card in a match without extra time: 90+2 minutes (Matías Fernández; Chile against Ecuador)
Fastest dismissal from kick off: 21 minutes (Carlos Zambrano; Peru against Chile)
Fastest dismissal of a substitute: 18 minutes (Carlos Bacca; Colombia against Brazil) 
Latest dismissal in a match without extra time: 90+4 minutes (Carlos Bacca; Colombia against Brazil and Neymar; Brazil against Colombia)
Least time difference between two yellow cards given to the same player: 19 minutes (Matías Fernández; Chile against Ecuador)
Most yellow cards (team): 14 (Paraguay)
Most red cards (team): 2 (Uruguay)
Fewest yellow cards (team): 4 (Mexico)
Most yellow cards (player): 3 (Richard Ortiz)
Most red cards (player): 1 (Fernando Amorebieta, Carlos Bacca, Edinson Cavani, Jorge Fucile, Matías Fernández, Neymar, Carlos Zambrano)
Most yellow cards (match): 8 (Argentina against Colombia)
Most red cards (match): 2 (Chile against Uruguay, Brazil against Colombia)
Fewest yellow cards (match): 1 (Chile against Peru)
Most cards in one match: 6 yellow cards, 2 red cards (Chile against Uruguay)

Detailed statistics

By match

By referee

By team

By player
1 red card

 Neymar
 Matías Fernández
 Carlos Bacca
 Carlos Zambrano
 Edinson Cavani
 Jorge Fucile
 Fernando Amorebieta

3 yellow cards
 Javier Mascherano
 Marcos Rojo
 Richard Ortiz

2 yellow cards

 Danny Bejarano
 Pablo Escobar
 Neymar
 Matías Fernández
 Mauricio Pinilla
 James Rodríguez
 Carlos Sánchez
 Osbaldo Lastra
 Rodolph Austin
 Pablo Aguilar
 Bruno Valdez
 Josepmir Ballón
 Paolo Guerrero
 Carlos Lobatón
 Yoshimar Yotún
 Edinson Cavani
 Jorge Fucile
 Diego Godín
 Álvaro Pereira
 Luis Manuel Seijas

1 yellow card

 Sergio Agüero
 Éver Banega
 Lucas Biglia
 Lionel Messi
 Nicolás Otamendi
 Javier Pastore
 Sergio Romero
 Facundo Roncaglia
 Pablo Zabaleta
 Alejandro Chumacero
 Cristian Coimbra
 Miguel Hurtado
 Leonel Morales
 Marcelo Moreno
 Ricardo Pedriel
 Romel Quiñónez
 Edward Zenteno
 Dani Alves
 Philippe Coutinho
 Fernandinho
 Roberto Firmino
 Filipe Luís
 Thiago Silva
 Charles Aránguiz
 Marcelo Díaz
 Mauricio Isla
 Gonzalo Jara
 Gary Medel
 Francisco Silva
 Jorge Valdivia
 Arturo Vidal
 Santiago Arias
 Juan Cuadrado
 Radamel Falcao
 Teófilo Gutiérrez
 Alexander Mejía
 Cristián Zapata
 Juan Camilo Zúñiga
 Miller Bolaños
 Frickson Erazo
 Renato Ibarra
 Fidel Martínez
 Pedro Quiñónez
 Michael Hector
 Jobi McAnuff
 Wes Morgan
 Jevaughn Watson
 Hugo Ayala
 Marco Fabián
 Gerardo Flores
 Eduardo Herrera
 Lucas Barrios
 Víctor Cáceres
 Paulo da Silva
 Derlis González
 Osvaldo Martínez
 Osmar Molinas
 Miguel Samudio
 Néstor Ortigoza
 Luis Advíncula
 Jefferson Farfán
 Pedro Gallese
 Claudio Pizarro
 Juan Manuel Vargas
 Carlos Zambrano
 Sebastián Coates
 José Giménez
 Nicolás Lodeiro
 Abel Hernández
 Maxi Pereira
 Fernando Amorebieta
 Gabriel Cichero
 Franklin Lucena
 Andrés Túñez
 Ronald Vargas
 Oswaldo Vizcarrondo

Fair Play Award
The Fair Play Award was given to the team with the best overall discipline throughout the tournament, Peru. Teams were given a certain number of points — 15 in the first stage, 5 in the quarter-finals, and 10 points for the remaining four teams — from which points were deducted depending on the infraction. As the team that advanced past the first stage with the most points, Peru were awarded the trophy. Teams that drop below 0 points were excluded from winning the award.

References

External links

Disciplinary Record